The United States Professional Tennis Association (USPTA) is an organization which offers certification and professional development for professional tennis teachers and tennis coaches.

The organization has approximately 13,500 members in the United States, and promotes excellence in the tennis industry.

The on-court component of the certification exam, which is offered at various locations across the U.S., requires players to demonstrate proper grip and the ability to hit to specific areas of the court with each stroke.

The organization's newsletter, USPTA ADDvantage, offers news, professional development materials, and video for coaches and teaching professionals.

Since 2006, USPTA has partnered with ThanksUSA for "Tennis Thanks the Troops" to raise money for tennis scholarships for US military family members.

See also 

 United States Tennis Association
 American Tennis Association

References

Official website 
 United States Professional Tennis Association

Tennis in the United States
1927 establishments in the United States